Bihar al-Anwar (lit. Seas of Lights) is a comprehensive collection of traditions (ahadith) compiled by Shia scholar Mohammad-Baqer Majlesi (d. 1110/1698), known as Allama Majlisi. It is a hadith collection as the secondary source used beside the Four Books.
Bihar al-Anwar which a compendium of Hadiths, historical subjects and commentaries on many Qur'anic verses, completed between 1106 AH (1694 AD) and 1110 AH (1698 AD).

Title
The full name of the book, Biḥār al-ʾAnwār al-Jāmiʿah li-Durar ʾAkhbār al-ʾAʾimmah al-Aṭhār (lit. Seas of Lights: The Collection for Pearls of Traditions of the Pure Imams) illustrates that Majlisi did not collect anything he had access to in the book.

Author
Mohammad-Baqer Majlesi was born in 1617 in Isfahan. He was a student of Mulla Sadra. He has been described as the most powerful and influential Shia Ulems. On 1687, he was appointed as Sheikh ul-Islam by Sultan Husayn in Isfahan, the capital city of the Persian Empire. He developed Twelver doctrine by investigating Shia and Sunni hadith. Over 100 books in Arabic and Persian were authored by him.

Prelude
Majlisi compiled it to gather all the ahadith he could access. His primary goal was to preserve the available knowledge for future generations. Majlisi has acknowledged this issue in the preface of Bihar al-Anwar, emphasizing that the traditions collected were not included without being subjected to scrutiny, a task in itself that was a major undertaking. Majlisi says, "Then I chose to examine the traditions of the infallible, righteous Imams, started exploring them and investigated them as was their right and I acquired its skill as was its due." Despite Majlisi acknowledgment, criticism has remained about his approach with some critics suggesting that he has gathered both "pearls" and "pebbles".This book includes all the narrations that receive to Shia. Writing Bihar lasted about 36 years. To write this book, Majlisi got help from other scholars and his students.

Context
Bihar al-Anwar as the most comprehensive hadith collections includes narrations of Shias (Twelver), based on Shia sources. The collection also contains his commentary on these narrations. He used about 400 sources which were written by Sunni and Shia scholars such as, Shaykh al-Saduq, Shaykh Tusi, Al-Shaykh Al-Mufid, Sharif al-Murtaza, Muhammad Jamaluddin al-Makki al-Amili, Sayyed Ibn Tawus, Al-Hilli, Zayn al-Din al-Juba'i al'Amili. Author wrote this book in 25 volumes, but, a new version is published in 110 volumes by some changes and contains more than 100,000 hadith from sunni and shia sources.

Editions
 Majlisī, Muḥammad Bāqir al-, Biḥār al-nwār al-Jāmiʿahli-Durar Akhbār al-Aʾimmat al-Aṭhār [The Oceans of Lights: A Compendium of the Pearls of the Narrations of the Pure Imāms], 110 vols (Beirut: Muʾassasat al-Wafāʾ, 1983).

Commentaries
 Mashra'a bihar al-anwar by Muhammad Asif Mohseni

See also
 List of Shi'a books
 Nahj al-Balagha
Safavid conversion of Iran to Shia Islam
Du'a al-Kumayl
Sharif al-Murtaza
Al-Sharif al-Radi
Al-Shaykh Al-Mufid
Shaykh Tusi
ibn Babawayh
Muhammad ibn Ya'qub al-Kulayni
Amina Bint al-Majlisi
Al-Hurr al-Aamili

References

External links
Bihar al-Anwar Volumes 1 – 34 English Translation, compiled by Allamah Majlesi, translated by Hub-e-Ali organization, publicly available for free.
 Bihar Al-Anwar, Kitab al-Ghaybah (Vols. 51, 52 & 53) – The Promised Mahdi, English Translation Part 1 and Part 2, compiled by Allamah Majlesi, translated by Athar Husayn S.H. Rizvi, publicly available for free.

Shia hadith collections